Nicola Quaglio (born 9 March 1991) is an Italian rugby union player. His usual position is as a Prop, and he currently plays for Italian Top10 team Rovigo Delta.

Quaglio played with Italian Pro14 team Benetton from 2016 to 2021. 

In 2011, Quaglio was named in the Italy Under 20 squad and from 2016 he was also named in the Italy squad.
On 18 August 2019, he was named in the final 31-man squad for the 2019 Rugby World Cup.

References

External links
ESPN Profile
It's Rugby England Profile

1991 births
Living people
Italian rugby union players
Italy international rugby union players
People from Rovigo
Rugby union props
Rugby Rovigo Delta players
Benetton Rugby players
Sportspeople from the Province of Rovigo